DWBC (1422 AM) was a radio station owned by Advanced Media Broadcasting System an affiliate of ACWS - United Broadcasting Network. The station's studio was located at FEMS Tower 1, Osmeña Highway, Manila.

References

News and talk radio stations in the Philippines
Radio stations established in 1988
Radio stations disestablished in 2007
Defunct radio stations in Metro Manila